The Anglin is a river in central France. Anglin may also refer to:

People
Andrew Anglin (born 1984), editor of the neo-Nazi website The Daily Stormer
Anne Anglin (born 1942), Canadian actress
Francis Alexander Anglin (1865–1933), Chief Justice of Canada from 1924 until 1933
Jack Anglin (1916–1963), American country music singer
Jahshaun Anglin (born 2001), Jamaican footballer
Joe Anglin, an American-born Canadian politician
John Anglin (Medal of Honor) (1850–1905), sailor in the U.S. Navy during the American Civil War
Margaret Anglin (1876–1958), Canadian-born Broadway actress, director and producer
Timothy Anglin, (1822–1896), Canadian politician and Speaker of the Canadian House of Commons 
Winston Anglin (1962–2004), Jamaican international football player
The Anglin brothers, American criminals who took part in the June 1962 Alcatraz escape
John Anglin (criminal) (1930–missing since 1962)
Clarence Anglin (1931–missing since 1962)

Places
 Anglin, Washington, a community in the US
 Anglin Bay, a bay on the western shore of the Cataraqui River at Kingston, Ontario
 Anglin Lake, a lake in Saskatchewan
 Anglin Lake, Saskatchewan, a hamlet in Saskatchewan

Other uses
 Anglin J6 Karatoo, an Australian aircraft

See also
Los Anglin, West Virginia, an unincorporated community in Lewis County, West Virginia